Geneva is a city in Ontario and Seneca counties in the U.S. state of New York. It is at the northern end of Seneca Lake; all land portions of the city are within Ontario County; the water portions are in Seneca County. The population was 13,261 at the 2010 census. The city is supposedly named after the city and canton of Geneva in Switzerland. The main settlement of the Seneca was spelled Zoneshio by early white settlers, and was described as being two miles north of Seneca Lake.

The city borders, and was once part of, the town of Geneva. The city identifies as the "Lake Trout Capital of the World."

History 

The area was long occupied by the Seneca tribe, which had established a major village of Kanadaseaga here by 1687. The British helped fortify the village against the French of Canada during the Seven Years' War (locally known as the French and Indian War); later they added defensive fortifications against the Americans during the Revolutionary War. During the latter warfare, the punitive Sullivan Expedition of 1779 mounted by rebel forces destroyed many of the dwellings, as well as the winter stores of the people, and they abandoned the ruins. Following the war and the forced removal of the Seneca from their native land, European-Americans settled here about 1793. They developed a town encouraged by the Pulteney Association, which owned the land and was selling plots.

At the end of the Revolutionary War, Lt. Col. Seth Reed (né Read), who had fought at Bunker Hill, was one of many pioneers who moved from Massachusetts into Ontario County. By trade with the Seneca, he bought a tract of land eighteen miles in extent. (This was illegal, as only the US government was authorized to make land deals with the Native Americans.) This occurred in 1787, while his wife Hannah stayed in Uxbridge, Massachusetts with their family. "Seth Read moved his wife Hannah and their family to Geneva, Ontario County, New York in the winter of 1790".

The settlement at Geneva was not yet permanent; the European Americans continued to harass the Seneca on the frontier. In 1795 Read and his family removed to Erie, Pennsylvania, where they became the earliest European-American settlers.

The "Village of Geneva" was incorporated in 1806, formally separating it from the surrounding area of Geneva Town. Later the village became a city through a 1871 charter.

In the 1830s, a government surveyor named John Brink named both Geneva Lake and Lake Geneva in Wisconsin after Geneva, New York.  Geneva, Nebraska, founded in 1871, is considered to have been named after the one in New York, rather than directly for the Swiss city.

Geography
The town is at the two-mile wide northern outlet of Seneca Lake, a lake that spans 34 miles south to Watkins Glen. Geneva is in the Finger Lakes region, the largest wine-producing area in New York State. The Cayuga-Seneca Canal is part of the watershed of Keuka Lake. It flows north through Geneva, connecting to the Erie Canal, which was completed in 1825, giving access for the region to the Great Lakes and midwestern markets for their produce, as well as to buy natural resource commodities.

According to the United States Census Bureau, the city has a total area of 5.8 square miles (15.2 km2). 4.3 square miles (11.0 km2) of it is land and 1.6 square miles (4.1 km2) of it (27.18%) is water.

Geneva is connected via the east–west US 20, concurrent with NY 5. NY 14 is a north–south highway through the city. It is approximately equidistant from Rochester and Syracuse, each being about 45 miles away.

Climate

According to the Köppen Climate Classification system, Geneva has a warm-summer humid continental climate, abbreviated "Dfb" on climate maps.

Demographics

As of the census of 2000, there were 13,617 people, 5,014 households, and 2,933 families residing in the city.  The population density was 3,199.5 inhabitants per square mile (1,234.2/km2). There were 5,564 housing units at an average density of 1,307.4 per square mile (504.3/km2). The racial makeup of the city was 81.52% White, 10.22% African American, 0.25% Native American, 1.23% Asian, 0.05% Pacific Islander, 3.39% from other races, and 3.34% from two or more races. Hispanic or Latino of any race were 8.50% of the population.

There were 5,014 households, out of which 29.5% had children under the age of 18 living with them, 38.6% were married couples living together, 15.9% had a female householder with no husband present, and 41.5% were non-families. 34.1% of all households were made up of individuals, and 14.8% had someone living alone who was 65 years of age or older.  The average household size was 2.35 and the average family size was 3.03.

In the city, the population was spread out, with 23.2% under the age of 18, 18.9% from 18 to 24, 24.3% from 25 to 44, 18.1% from 45 to 64, and 15.5% who were 65 years of age or older.  The median age was 32 years. For every 100 females, there were 87.4 males.  For every 100 females age 18 and over, there were 84.5 males.

The median income for a household in the city was $31,600, and the median income for a family was $41,224. Males had a median income of $31,315 versus $23,054 for females. The per capita income for the city was $15,609.  About 13.7% of families and 17.5% of the population were below the poverty line, including 27.2% of those under age 18 and 7.8% of those age 65 or over.

Economy

Tourism
One of the major industries in and around Geneva is winemaking. The area is becoming increasingly popular for agritourism: there are over 100 wineries in the Finger Lakes Region, and the Seneca Lake wine trail provides easy access to many of these from Geneva. As Geneva grows as a tourist destination, so does the number of rooms available. Along with this growth, FLX Table opened in 2016 under the vision of a master sommelier, soon after winning the USA Today recognition of best new restaurant in the country.

In 2015, the National Civic League chose Geneva as one of ten cities from across the country to receive its annual All-America City Award. In June 2017, it was announced Geneva would receive $10 million from New York (state) as part of a downtown revitalization initiative as well as an additional $5 million for a welcome center.

Government
Geneva uses a mayor-council form of government. The mayor is elected at large. The council consists of eight members. Six are elected from one of six wards. The other two are elected at large. Former Ward 3 councilor Steve Valentino is the Mayor of the City of Geneva and Amie Hendrix serves as the City Manager. The current mayoral and council term runs from January 1, 2020, through December 31, 2024.

Education 

The Geneva City School District operates the local public primary and secondary schools. The district has two elementary schools, North Street School (3rd-5th) and West Street School (K-2). The district's secondary schools are Geneva Middle School and Geneva High School.

Private schools include:
 Children's Hours School, a private school for toddlers through first grade. Its enrollment is about 27 students. The current director is Ms. Mary Bohle.
 St. Francis-St. Stephen's School, a Roman Catholic elementary school that teaches grades PreK-8 in Geneva. The current principal is Mrs. Mary Mantelli.
 Rose Academy, a school of Experiential Learning for grades 1–5. The curriculum includes GLOBAL Science, Reading A-Z Program, Touch Point Math, Art, Music, Physical Education. It was founded by Dr. Lorraine Williams.

Colleges and universities include:
 Hobart and William Smith Colleges, the successor institution to Geneva College.
 The New York State Agricultural Experiment Station of Cornell University's College of Agriculture and Life Sciences.
 Finger Lakes Community College has two campuses in Geneva: the Geneva Campus Center and the Viticulture and Wine Center.

Notable people 

 Maria Abbey, American Civil War volunteer nurse
 Debito Arudou/Dave Aldwinckle, English teacher, author and activist in Japan.
 Elizabeth Blackwell studied here, graduating from the medical school at what was then Geneva College in 1849; she was the first woman qualified as a medical doctor in the United States.
 Robert Stanley Breed, American Biologist, known especially for his researches on the post-embryonic development of insects and for his contributions to scientific journals on the public milk supply.
 Maria Cook, first woman to be recognized as a Universalist preacher.
 Travie McCoy, frontman of the alternative hip-hop group Gym Class Heroes.
 Cynthia DeFelice, children's book author
 Timothy DiDuro, drummer for the American rock bands Skid Row and Slaughter.
 Arthur Dove, artist
 Charles J. Folger, lawyer, jurist and statesman.
 Rocky Fratto, NABF Boxing Champion and #2 rated contender in the world.
 Libby Gill, business coach and consultant.
 Steve Golin, founder of Anonymous Content; he won Best Picture at the 2016 Academy Awards for Spotlight
 Gym Class Heroes, music group
 Michael Hashim, jazz musician
 Thomas Hillhouse, farmer, banker and statesman
 U.P. Hedrick horticulturist, Experiment Station scientist 1905–47; Director 1928–37.
 Robert Holley, Nobel Prize Winner in Science, 1968. Experiment Station scientist 1948–58.
 John H. Hobart, Episcopal bishop of New York, founded Geneva College (predecessor of Hobart College), namesake of Hobart, Wisconsin.
 Lauren Holly, actress
 David Hudson, lawyer, writer and statesman.
 Luther Sage "Yellowstone" Kelly.  Sioux War Indian scout, western hunter and adventurer, and government administrator.  Born in Geneva on July 27, 1849. Buried in Billings, Montana at Kelly Mountain.
 Michael Muhammad Knight, author
 Scott LaFaro, influential Jazz bassist, most notably with the first Bill Evans Trio.
 Christine Lavin, folk singer
 Sara Miranda Maxson Cobb (1858–1917), art educator
 John Nicholas, former US Congressman
 Robert C. Nicholas, former New York State Senator
 John Raines, former US Congressman
 Seth Reed, Lt. Colonel who fought at Bunker Hill, early settler of Geneva, (1790–1795), was instrumental in adding E Pluribus Unum to US coins, and founded Erie, PA in 1795.
 Robert L. Rose, former US Congressman
 William Smith, entrepreneur, namesake of William Smith College
 Ada L. F. Snell, English professor at Mount Holyoke College
 Otto Stern, Inventor of Miracle-Gro
 Mark Thornton, economist, author, libertarian politician
 Jerry Wall, Medal of Honor recipient in the American Civil War
 Marshall P. Wilder, humorist
 Wilmer & the Dukes, R&B band
 William W. Wright, politician
 John Zakour, novelist / humorist

References

External links

 City's website 
 Chamber of Commerce website

 
Cities in New York (state)
Populated places established in 1793
Cities in Rochester metropolitan area, New York
Cities in Seneca County, New York
Cities in Ontario County, New York
1793 establishments in New York (state)
Rochester metropolitan area, New York